The Lufthansa Airport Express was an express train service in Germany, initially linking Düsseldorf and Frankfurt am Main Flughafen (Frankfurt Airport), and later Stuttgart too. The trains were operated by Deutsche Bundesbahn (German Federal Railway, or DB) on behalf of the German airline Lufthansa, and with the airline providing the on-board customer service staff, and its use was limited to Lufthansa customers taking airplane flights into or out of Frankfurt or Düsseldorf airports.

Preparations 
In 1981 the German airline Lufthansa wanted to lower the costs of the very expensive shorthaul flights between Düsseldorf Airport and Frankfurt am Main, and they came up with the idea of replacing these flights with rail transport. The Deutsche Bundesbahn agreed and eliminated a problem of their own, that the Class 403 (1973) electric multiple units (EMUs) that were stored and not generating any revenue because they did not fit into the two-class InterCity system. On 13 and 16 February 1981, the Class 403 made test runs as TEE Goethe on the West Rhine Railway. The Class 403, consisting of three EMUs only, were refurbished and re-fitted with the same seats as the Lufthansa DC-10 business class and the grey-yellow Lufthansa livery on the outside.

Flight level zero
On 27 March 1982, the Lufthansa Airport Express started with four trips a day in each direction. Initially starting at Düsseldorf Hbf, and calling at Köln Deutz station, Köln Hbf and the West German capital Bonn, one year later the route was extended northward to Düsseldorf Flughafen (Düsseldorf Airport) station. Although the Lufthansa Airport Express was integrated into Lufthansa's reservation system using flight numbers and never integrated in the TEE booking office, the Deutsche Bundesbahn classified the trains as Trans Europ Express in their operation. This meant a double numbering of the trains, e.g. "Flight" LH 1001 was TEE 61 for railway staff. The "flights" at flight level zero were carried out by two EMUs using the West Rhine Railway, whilst the third one received maintenance.   The trains were not officially TEEs and the Thomas Cook Continental Timetable identified the Lufthansa Airport Express not as TEEs but as "special trains for Lufthansa passengers holding air tickets. Ordinary rail tickets [are] not valid on these trains."

Timetable 

On 1 June 1986, the "flight" and train numbers were unified; LH 1001 became train number TEE 1001, etc. One year later the EuroCity network replaced most TEEs (including all remaining TEEs in Germany), so DB dropped the designation "TEE" for the LHAE service.

The service provided a non-stop journey linking the West-German capital Bonn with the international airport in Frankfurt. North of Bonn it called in the city centres rather than at the airports outside. On board, the passengers were served by Lufthansa stewardesses like in an airplane. It appeared to be successful in both passenger figures and costs compared to the Boeing 737 used before.  In the summer of 1988 the seating capacity was enlarged and one year later the same formula was introduced between Frankfurt Airport and Stuttgart. 

With the extension to the south more rolling stock was needed, so some class 103 locomotives were repainted in Lufthansa livery and coaches were refurbished in the same way as the EMUs. Despite festivities celebrating the tenth anniversary of the Lufthansa Airport Express in 1992, with promotional statements addressing the success, the service ended on 22 May 1993. The combination of the poor financial state of Lufthansa and the need for an expensive midlife overhaul of the 1973-built EMUs, led to the withdrawal of the service.

References

Works cited

External links

Named passenger trains of Germany
Trans Europ Express
Railway services introduced in 1982
Airport Express